The Sovetsky Soyuz-class battleships (Project 23, "Soviet Union"), also known as "Stalin's Republics", were a class of battleships begun by the Soviet Union in the late 1930s but never brought into service. They were designed in response to the s being built by Germany. Only four hulls of the fifteen originally planned had been laid down by 1940, when the decision was made to cut the program to only three ships to divert resources to an expanded army rearmament program.

These ships would have rivaled the Imperial Japanese  and America's planned  in size if any had been completed, although with significantly weaker firepower: nine  guns compared to the nine  guns of the Japanese ships and a dozen  on the Montanas.  The failure of the Soviet armor plate industry to build cemented armor plates thicker than  would have negated any advantages from the Sovetsky Soyuz class's thicker armor in combat.

Construction of the first four ships was plagued with difficulties as the Soviet shipbuilding and related industries were not prepared to build such large ships. One battleship, Sovetskaya Belorussiya, was cancelled on 19 October 1940 after serious construction flaws were found. Construction of the other three ships was suspended shortly after Nazi Germany invaded the Soviet Union in June 1941, and never resumed. All three of the surviving hulls were scrapped in the late 1940s.

Design and development
Design work began in 1935 on new battleships in response to the existing and planned German battleships, and the Soviets made extensive efforts in Italy and the United States to purchase either drawings or the ships themselves in the late 1930s. The Italian firm of Gio. Ansaldo & C. proposed a ship of  standard displacement with nine 16-inch (406 mm) guns, in size and appearance similar to the  then under construction by the company.  The U.S. firm of Gibbs & Cox provided four designs; one for a conventional battleship, and three hybrid designs which combined battleship main armament with a raised flight deck on the central superstructure capable of operating up to 30 aircraft.  While these projects proved useful to the Soviets, they decided to proceed with their own designs.

A few months later Admiral Orlov further reduced the size of the battleship to 45,000 tons and set the size of the main guns at 406 mm. Shortly afterward, the Soviet Union signed the Anglo-Soviet Quantitative Naval Agreement of 1937 and agreed to follow the terms of the Second London Naval Treaty that limited battleships to a displacement of 35,560 metric tons (35,000 long tons), although they did add a proviso that allowed them to build ships of unlimited size to face the Imperial Japanese Navy if they notified the British.

The design of KB-4, the surface ship design bureau of the Baltic Shipyard, was selected for further development although the lead designers were convinced that only a larger ship could fulfill the ambitious requirements. They did manage to get agreement on 22 November 1936 for a thickening of the deck armor that raised the displacement to about 47,000 tons. Design work continued on this basis and technical work was completed for a ship of 47,700 tons in April 1937, but the designers continued to press their case for larger ships. The issue was resolved by General Secretary Stalin at a meeting on 4 July when he agreed to increase displacement to about 56,000 tons. This forced the project to begin again.

The timing of the redesign proved to be inauspicious as the Great Purge was spreading through the ranks of the military and related industries. The original deadline for completion of design work by 15 October was missed, and an incomplete version was presented to the navy's Shipbuilding Administration the next month. A number of details remained to be worked out, including the final design of the machinery plant, the 152 mm guns and the 100 mm gun mounts. In the meantime, extensive and expensive testing was conducted on the ship's hull form, deck armor and torpedo protection; 27 million rubles were spent on experimental work in 1938 alone. Over 100 models of the hull were tested in a ship model basin to find the best hull form and two one-tenth-scale launches were built at Sevastopol to test the hull's maneuverability. An old steamship was fitted with a replica of the design's armor decks and tested against  bombs, proving that such ordnance would generally penetrate both the  upper and  middle decks before exploding on the armored deck. The main armor deck was raised one deck in consequence and a splinter deck added underneath it to stop any bomb or shell fragments that might penetrate the armor deck. The underwater protection system was tested on fifteen one-fifth scale models and two full-sized experimental barges. These tests proved that the torpedo belt system of multiple bulkheads was superior to the Pugliese system of a large tube filled with smaller sealed tubes, but it was too late to incorporate these test results into the design as construction was well underway by the time they were completed in late 1939.

A revised design was approved on 28 February 1938 and the first ship was to be laid down on 15 July, but even this design was incomplete and would be revised later. Another change was the deletion of the centerline rudder when tests showed that the two wing rudders would not be able to counteract its effects if it jammed. The weight toward the stern of the boat was calculated to be too great, producing a substantial stern-down trim. To remedy this, the two 100 mm turrets mounted on the quarterdeck were deleted and the height of the armor belt abreast the rear turret was lowered, but this decision was reversed and they were restored by a decision of the State Defense Committee on 14 January 1941. This forced a revision of the aircraft arrangements as the aircraft catapult had to be removed from the centerline of the quarterdeck; two catapults were added to the sides of the quarterdeck instead.

General characteristics

The hull form was very full-bodied, especially at the forward magazines, where the torpedo protection system added width to the beam. Coupled with the relatively low length-to-beam ratio of 7.14:1, this meant that very powerful turbines were necessary to achieve even modest speeds. Stalin's decision that the Project 23-class ships would use three shafts instead of four increased the load on each shaft and reduced propulsive efficiency, although it did shorten the length of the armored citadel and thus overall displacement.

The Sovetsky Soyuz-class ships were provided with facilities to handle two to four KOR-2 flying boats which would be launched by the two catapults mounted on the stern. Two hangars were built into the after end of the forecastle deck to house two of them and cranes were provided at the forward end of the quarterdeck to hoist them out of the water.

Machinery
The machinery arrangement "provided good dispersal of the machinery spaces, but at the cost of very long runs for the wing shafts (ca. ). The turbine compartments for the wing shafts were located forward of boiler room No. 1 and aft of the No. 2 turret magazines. The engine room for the center shaft's turbine was between boiler room No. 2 and No. 3. This meant that the wing propeller shafts had to run underneath the boilers.

The steam turbines, and a license to build them, were originally going to be ordered from Cammell Laird in the United Kingdom, but their £700,000 cost was more than the Soviets wanted to pay. Instead they bought them from Brown Boveri, using the technical information acquired from Cammell Laird in the process, for £400,000. Four single-reduction, impulse-reduction geared turbines were ordered from the Swiss firm, three to equip Sovetskaya Rossiya and one to serve as a pattern for the factory in Kharkov that was to build the remainder.

Maximum speed was estimated at 28 knots, using the revised propeller design, although forcing the machinery would yield an extra knot.

Armament

The main armament consisted of three electrically powered MK-1 triple turrets, each with three 50-caliber 406 mm B-37 guns. The guns could be depressed to −2° and elevated to 45°. They had a fixed loading angle of 6° and their rate of fire varied with the time required to re-aim the guns. It ranged from 2.0 to 2.6 rounds per minute depending on the elevation. The turrets could elevate at a rate of 6.2 degrees per second and traverse at 4.55 degrees per second. 100 rounds per gun were carried.

The secondary armament consisted of twelve 57-caliber B-38 152 mm guns mounted in six twin-gun MK-4 turrets. Their elevation limits were −5° to +45° with a fixed loading angle of 8°. Their rate of fire also varied with the elevation from 7.5 to 4.8 rounds per minute. They were provided with 170 rounds per gun. The turrets could elevate at a rate of 13 degrees per second and traverse at 6 degrees per second.

Heavy anti-aircraft (AA) fire was provided by a dozen 56-caliber 100 mm B-34 dual-purpose guns in six twin-gun MZ-14 turrets with 400 rounds per gun. The ships began construction with only four turrets, but two additional turrets were restored to the quarterdeck in January 1941. They could elevate to a maximum of 85° and depress to −8°. They could traverse at a rate of 12° per second and elevate at 10° per second.

Light AA defense was handled by ten quadruple, water-cooled, 46-K mounts fitted with  70-K guns with 1800 rounds per gun. Initially only eight mounts were planned when the ships began construction, but two more were added later, probably in January 1941, one on each side of the forward superstructure. Each mount was fully enclosed to protect the crew from the muzzle blast of the larger guns and against splinters.

Fire control
Each main gun turret was given a DM-12  rangefinder for use in local control, but they were generally controlled by one of three KDP-8 fire-control directors. These had two  stereoscopic rangefinders, one to track the target and the other to measure the range to the ship's own shell splashes. The other was mounted on top of the conning tower and was protected by 50 mm of armor. They used a TsAS-0 mechanical computer to generate firing solutions. Four KDP-4t-II directors, with two  rangefinders each, controlled the secondary armament. One pair was on either side of the tower-mast and the aft pair was on each side of the aft funnel. Three SPN-300 stabilized directors, each with a 4-meter rangefinder, controlled the heavy anti-aircraft guns. There was one on each side of the forward funnel while the other was atop the rear superstructure.

Protection
The plants tended to compensate by making the thicker plates harder, but this often made them more brittle and large numbers did not pass the acceptance tests. This would have significantly reduced the level of protection enjoyed by the Sovetsky Soyuz-class ships in combat.

Their armor was intended to resist 406 mm shells and 500 kg bombs, specifically shells fired from forward bearings between 35° and 50° from the centerline. This led to the very unusual situation where the armor belt thickened toward the bow to compensate for the narrowing of the ship near the forward magazines, which had to be compensated for by thicker armor. It was inclined 5° to increase its resistance to flat-trajectory shells. Forward of this bulkhead was a 20 mm splinter belt that continued all the way to the bow. The main armor belt dropped down to the main deck from the upper deck abreast the aft turret to reduce weight. This "step" was protected by  plates. A  transverse bulkhead separated the rear turret and the ship's sides. The main part of the armored citadel was closed off by a 230 mm forward bulkhead and a 180 mm rear bulkhead, both of homogeneous armor.

Below it, the 50 mm middle deck acted as a splinter deck. The upper deck was 100 mm thick above the 220 mm waterline belt extension. The bottom edge of the forward splinter belt met with a  arched deck. Another arched deck of the same thickness covered the stern aft of the rear transverse bulkhead.

The MK-4 turrets had 100 mm faces and 65 mm sides. Their barbettes were 100 mm in thickness, but reduced to 65 mm on their inboard sides. 100 mm of armor protected the faces, sides and backs of the MZ-14 turrets for the 100 mm guns, but their roofs and barbettes were 100 mm thick. The forward conning tower had walls 425 mm thick while the rear conning tower had only . The flag bridge in the tower-mast had  of protection.

The ships were intended to be able to remain afloat with any five adjacent compartments flooded or with three torpedo hits and the destruction of the unarmored above-water side. The Pugliese system protected  of the ships' midsection. At the aft end was a multi-bulkhead protection system that extended another  to the rear from the Pugliese system. The depth of the system was  amidships, but it reduced to  fore and aft. The  diameter cylinder was intended to be immersed in fuel oil or water.

Construction
The August 1938 shipbuilding plan envisioned a total of 15 Project 23-class battleships, and this grandiose scheme was only slightly revised downward to 14 ships in the August 1939 plan. Eight of these were to be laid down before 1942 and the remaining six before 1947. However, only four were actually laid down before the outbreak of World War II forced the Soviets to reassess their ambitious plans. On 19 October 1940 an order was issued, signed by Stalin and Molotov, that no new battleships would be laid down in order to concentrate on smaller ships' building (and also, probably, because more resources were required for the Army), one ship was to be scrapped, and priority should be given to only one of the three remaining battleships.

The Soviet shipbuilding and related industries proved to be incapable of supporting the construction of so many large ships at the same time. The largest warships built in the Soviet Union prior to 1938 were the  s, and even they had suffered from a number of production problems, but the Soviet leadership appeared to ignore the difficulties encountered in the construction of the Kirov class when ordering 14 much more ambitious ships. Construction of two more ships planned for Leningrad and Nikolayev had to move to the brand-new Shipyard Nr. 402 in Molotovsk because the existing shipyards could not be expanded to handle so many large ships. Components for these two ships had to be manufactured at Leningrad and shipped via the White Sea – Baltic Canal to Molotovsk. Also, the turret shop at Nikolaev proved to be too poorly equipped to assemble the 406 mm mountings and the propeller shafts had to be ordered in 1940 from Germany and the Netherlands as the domestic plants were already overburdened with orders. Shipbuilding steel proved to be in short supply in 1940, and a number of batches were rejected because they did not meet specifications. Armor plate production was even more problematic as only  of the anticipated  were delivered in 1939, and more than half of that was rejected. Furthermore, the armor plants proved to be incapable of making cemented plates over 230 mm, and inferior face-hardened plates had to substitute for all thicknesses over 200 mm.

Machinery problems were likely to delay the ships well past their intended delivery dates of 1943–1944. Three turbines were delivered by Brown Boveri in 1939 to Arkhangelsk for Sovetskaya Rossiya, but the Kharkhovskii Turbogenerator Works never completed a single turbine before the German invasion in June 1941. A prototype boiler was supposed to have been built ashore for evaluation, but it was not completed until early 1941, which further complicated the production plan.

Construction of all three ships was ordered halted on 10 July 1941, and Sovetsky Soyuz was placed into long-term conservation as the most advanced ship. However, all three were officially stricken from the Navy List on 10 September 1941.

Sovetsky Soyuz
Sovetsky Soyuz (–Soviet Union) was formally laid down 15 July 1938 in Shipyard Nr. 189 (Ordzhonikidze) in Leningrad, although evidence suggests that construction actually began in January 1939 after her slipway was completed, the necessary cranes were in place, and working drawings had been completed. She was only lightly damaged by German air attacks and bombardments, and, as some material had been used during the siege of Leningrad, she was estimated to be 19.5% complete after the end of the war. Some thought was given to completing her, but this was opposed as she was regarded as obsolete in light of the experience gained during the war. Stalin's expressed desire to see one of the Project 23-class ships completed only delayed the decision to scrap her; this was ordered on 29 May 1948 and was well underway by April 1949.

Sovetskaya Ukraina
Sovetskaya Ukraina (–Soviet Ukraine) was laid down 31 October 1938 at Shipyard Nr. 198 (Marti South) in Nikolayev. When the war began she was 17.98% complete, with  assembled on the slipway. Some effort was made to launch the hull, but little work had been done to dredge the river at the foot of the slipway, and she was captured on 18 August 1941, although retreating Soviet troops slightly damaged her hull. They were forced to evacuate Nikolayev on 17 March 1944 and demolished the supporting blocks under her port side before they left, which gave her a list between 5 and 10 degrees and made her a total loss. She was ordered scrapped on 27 March 1947.

Sovetskaya Rossiya
Sovetskaya Rossiya (–Soviet Russia) was laid down on 22 July 1940 in Shipyard Nr. 402 in Molotovsk. She was ordered scrapped on 27 March 1947.

Sovetskaya Belorussiya
Sovetskaya Belorussiya (–Soviet Belorussia) was laid down 21 December 1939 at Shipyard Nr. 402 in Molotovsk, but construction was suspended in mid-1940 when it was discovered that 70,000 rivets used in her hull plating were of inferior quality. This fact probably influenced the decision to cancel her on 19 October 1940.  Material intended for her construction was used to construct a floating battery for the defense of Leningrad.

Sovetskaya Gruziya

Sovetskaya Gruziya was planned to be laid down in 1941 at the Baltic Works, but this was cancelled due to the invasion of the Soviet Union.

Notes

References

Bibliography

See also

 K-1000 battleship, a purported class of Soviet battleships to succeed Sovetsky Soyuz, promulgated hoax of the Soviet government.

External links
 Class specifications
 Article from ship.bsu.by 
 Article from www.battleships.spb.ru 

Battleship classes
World War II battleships of the Soviet Union
Abandoned military projects of the Soviet Union
Proposed ships
Cancelled ships